Sharrett is a surname. Notable people with the surname include:

Dave Sharrett II (1980–2008), United States Army soldier
Michael Sharrett (born 1965), American actor

See also
Thaddeus S. Sharretts (1850–1926), American judge
Starrett